I'm in the Band is an American teen sitcom that originally aired on Disney XD in the United States and on Family Channel in Canada. The first episode was taped on July 14, 2009, with a "sneak preview" airing on November 27, 2009; the show subsequently joined Disney XD's regular schedule on January 18, 2010, with the first episode being shown as a "sneak preview" in the United Kingdom on that same date. The show's January 18, 2010 premiere was watched by an estimated 860,000 viewers.

It was announced on April 26, 2010, that I'm in the Band had been renewed for a second season which premiered on January 17, 2011.

Premise
A teenager becomes lead guitarist for his favorite washed up rock band trying to make a comeback. They let him be lead guitarist in exchange for letting them live in his house in the suburbs.

Episodes

Characters

Main
Logan Miller as Tripp Campbell
Stephen Full as Ash
Greg Baker as Burger Pitt
Caitlyn Taylor Love as Izzy Fuentes
Steve Valentine as Derek Jupiter

Supporting

Beth Littleford as Beth Campbell
Reginald VelJohnson as Principal Cornelius Strickland
Aaron Albert as Jared
Hollywood Yates as Ernesto the Besto
Zayne Emory as Charles "Chucky" Albertson
Alan Thicke as Simon Craig
Mark Teich as Principal Maurice Jenkin
Spencer Boldman as Bryce Johnson

Cancellation
On March 15, 2011, Caitlyn Taylor Love and Greg Baker announced on their official Twitter accounts that the second season would be the show's last. On April 28, 2011, Disney XD officially announced the show's cancellation, with the remaining season 2 episodes to air for the remainder of the year. The final produced episode, "Raiders of the Lost Dad," aired on December 9, 2011.

Reception

Critical reception
Emily Ashby of Common Sense Media gave the show a mixed review. She stated that "while it's lighthearted, the show isn't exactly realistic when it comes to portraying adult responsibility," also noting that "there’s no shortage of laughs in I’m in the Band."

Viewership
The series premiered to an estimated 863,000 viewers proving to be the network's highest-rated series premiere for a Disney XD Original Series, including the Toon Disney phase.

References

External links

2000s American musical comedy television series
2010s American musical comedy television series
2000s American teen sitcoms
2010s American teen sitcoms
2009 American television series debuts
2011 American television series endings
English-language television shows
Disney XD original programming
Fictional musical groups
Television series about teenagers
Television series by It's a Laugh Productions
Television shows set in Los Angeles